Rafael Nadal defeated Tomáš Berdych in the final, 2–6, 6–2, 6–4 to win the singles tennis title at the 2005 Swedish Open.

Mariano Zabaleta was the defending champion, but lost in the quarterfinals to Berdych.

Seeds

Draw

Finals

Top half

Bottom half

External links
 Main draw
 Qualifying draw

Swedish Open
2005 ATP Tour 
Swedish